{{DISPLAYTITLE:C20H40O}}
The molecular formula C20H40O (molar mass: 296.53 g/mol, exact mass: 296.3079 u) may refer to:

 Isophytol
 Phytol

Molecular formulas